Adébísí is both a surname and a given name of Yoruba origin, meaning "the crown or royalty has produced more, or has given birth to more". Notable people with the name include:

Ade Adebisi (born 1986), Nigerian-born rugby league player
Mola Adebisi (born 1973), German television presenter and actor
Adebisi Akande, Nigerian politician
Adebisi Akanji (born 1930s), Nigerian artist

Fictional characters:
Simon Adebisi, character in the television series Oz

References

Yoruba given names
Yoruba-language surnames